HD 174569 is a spectroscopic binary star system in the equatorial constellation of Aquila. Based on stellar parallax measurements by Hipparcos, it is about 1,300 light-years (400 parsecs) away.

References

External links
 HR 7099
 Image HD 174569

Aquila (constellation)
174569
Spectroscopic binaries
K-type giants
7099
092475
Durchmusterung objects